Butler–Choctaw County Airport  is a city-owned public-use airport located  northeast of the central business district of Butler, a city in Choctaw County, Alabama, United States. According to the FAA's National Plan of Integrated Airport Systems for 2009–2013, it is categorized as a general aviation facility.

Facilities and aircraft 
For the 12-month period ending March 27, 2000, the airport had 1,920 general aviation aircraft operations.

References

External links 
 

Airports in Alabama
Transportation buildings and structures in Choctaw County, Alabama